A timeline of notable events relating to Hits Radio, a British commercial radio station operated by Bauer Radio.

1970s
1974
2 April – Piccadilly Radio, the first commercial radio station in Manchester, goes on the air, broadcasting on AM and FM.

1980s

1988
3 September – Piccadilly Radio splits its AM and FM services, launching adult-focused Key 103 on FM and mainstream service Piccadilly 1152 on AM.

1990s

1990
Piccadilly revises its AM/FM split to move closer to the format used by other commercial radio operators, moving mainstream music to FM (as 'Piccadilly Key 103' for a time) and older-skewing music to AM (initially as 'PIccadilly Gold' before later reverting to the Piccadilly 1152 name; the AM station would go on to become Magic in 1999, Key 2 in 2015 and Key Radio in 2018.)
1996
Key 103 and its AM sibling move from their original Piccadilly Plaza base to studios at Castlefield, where they remain based today.

2000s

2003
1 January – A station named The Hits, carrying the audio of the Box Plus Network television channel of the same name, appears on DAB in London.
April – The Hits on DAB switches away from the TV audio and becomes a dedicated radio stream, playing contemporary pop hits.
July – The Hits is made available nationally as a radio service when it is added to the radio section of the Freeview programme guide (as 'The Hits Radio' to differentiate itself from the television channel)
Late in year – The Hits expands its DAB coverage with its addition to multiplexes outside London, including Emap-owned platforms in Northern England
2004
early in year – the bitrate of The Hits on Emap's local DAB multiplexes is reduced to allow for the addition of heat radio. It is subsequently further reduced to allow the local Magic stations, which had also been hit by Heat's addition, to re-increase their bitrates.
April – The Hits is removed from Emap's local DAB multiplexes in favour of Kerrang! Radio.
2008
Emap's radio assets are acquired by Bauer Media.

2010s

2012
Late in year – The Hits reappears on Bauer's northern English DAB multiplexes, following a reduction in the bitrate used by heat radio.
2013
No events.
2014
No events.
2015
5 January – Bauer's network of FM contemporary hit radio services, including Key 103, are relaunched as the Bauer City 1 network. Most of the stations had already been carrying network programming from the Castlefield studios (such as In:Demand) in offpeak slots prior to the relaunch, and continued to do so thereafter. It was at this point that Magic 1152 on AM became Key 2.
19 January – 
The Hits is split into a network of fresh-hits DAB stations in Bauer's heritage areas – Bauer City 3 – with split localised news, branding and advertising, and shared programme content. This programming also remains available nationally on Freeview under The Hits Radio name. 
The Hits is removed from DAB in London and Birmingham, the Birmingham space going to Kisstory (then to KissFresh after Kisstory's move to Sound Digital in 2016).
2016
No events.
2017
1 September – The Bauer City 3 network is disbanded, and The Hits as a single national service returns to DAB in its place.
2018
18 April – Key 103 announces on-air that it will relaunch as a national station under the name Hits Radio from 4 June. The new station logo and some information about programming, including the new breakfast show, is unveiled.
23 May – Absolute Radio 70s and Kerrang! Radio are removed from DAB in London and replaced by a stereo placeholder service of music and announcements listed as Hits Radio – this placeholder is also rolled out to numerous other DAB areas, mostly in newly created slots on Arqiva's NOWdigital multiplexes.
late May – Magic Soul is replaced on DAB in Birmingham by the Hits Radio placeholder.
1 June – Key 103 and The Hits Radio cease presented programming at 6pm and run a 60-hour sequence of music and announcements in preparation for the impending relaunch. The Hits' social media accounts are deleted and Key 103's relabelled as 'HitsRadioUK'.
4 June – Hits Radio Manchester launches, replacing Key 103 on FM in Manchester; Hits Radio UK launches replacing The Hits on DAB and Freeview. Gethin Jones, Gemma Atkinson and Dave Vitty launch the Manchester station on-air, with Greatest Day by Take That, winner of an online Manchester Evening News poll, the first song played.
2019
No events.

2020s
2020
28 August – Hits Radio launches its first spin-off station – Hits Radio Pride. It is aimed at the LGBTQ+ community.
31 August – Hits Radio South Coast launches, thereby becoming the second FM station to be known on air as Hits Radio. The station had previously broadcast as The Breeze South Coast and the change is made following the purchase in 2019 of The Breeze network from Celador Radio.
3 November – Hits Radio Suffolk launches on DAB digital radio, taking up the slot which had been carrying the local iteration of Greatest Hits Radio since September (and prior to this Town 102); the switch is made in tandem with the GHR affiliation switching to the former Ipswich 102. Like the digital-only North Yorkshire Hits Radio, all programming output is shared with the Hits network feed, but the option to use localised identity, news/information and advertising is retained.
2021
6 September – Bournemouth-based Fire Radio and Bristol-based Sam FM rebrand as Hits Radio. Both stations retain local drivetime shows.
2022
19 September – Nation Broadcasting replaces Hits Radio South Coast on FM with Easy Radio South Coast. Bauer provides a replacement Hits Radio feed via the South Hampshire DAB multiplex. 
1 October – Hits Radio Suffolk is withdrawn from DAB as the capacity reverts to carrying Greatest Hits Radio; this takes place in tandem with the 102 FM service transitioning from GHR to Nation Radio Suffolk.
2023
April – CFM in Cumbria is scheduled to transfer from the Hits Radio Network to Greatest Hits Radio, with Hits Radio programming to remain available in the area over DAB.

References

British history timelines
United Kingdom radio timelines